John Hoyle (d. 1797?), was author of a dictionary of musical terms entitled Dictionarium Musica [sic]; Being a Complete Dictionary or Treasury of Music, London, 1770; It was republished, with a new title, in 1790 and 1791. The work was pronounced "short and incomplete" by the Critical Review for February 1791.

References

Attribution	

1790s deaths
English writers
Year of birth unknown
English male writers